David Plummer may refer to:

 David Plummer (musician), English musician and author of children's books and music
 David Plummer (swimmer) (born 1985), American backstroke swimmer
 David Plummer (programmer), (born 1968), American/Canadian entrepreneur and programmer, author of Task Manager in Windows, Space Cadet pinball Windows NT port, and more.